A sharpener is an implement for sharpening; the term may refer to:
Knife sharpening
Pencil sharpener
Sharpening jig, used to sharpen woodworking tools
Sharpening rod, another name for honing steel

Sharpening